Rameau is a crater on Mercury. It was named by the IAU in 1976, after French composer Jean Philippe Rameau.

The scarp Discovery Rupes cuts across Rameau crater.

References

Impact craters on Mercury